SYR4: Goodbye 20th Century is an album by American alternative rock band Sonic Youth. It is a double album of versions of pieces by avant-garde composers, performed by Sonic Youth and collaborators.

Background 
SYR4 featured works by avant-garde classical composers such as John Cage, Yoko Ono, Steve Reich and Christian Wolff, played by Sonic Youth and several collaborators from the modern avant-garde music scene, such as Christian Marclay, William Winant, Wharton Tiers and Takehisa Kosugi.

Unlike other entries in the SYR series, SYR4's liner notes were written in English.

Thurston Moore and Kim Gordon's daughter Coco Hayley Moore, about 5 years old at the time of recording, provided the vocals for "Voice Piece for Soprano" on disc 1.

Track listing

Release 
SYR4: Goodbye 20th Century was released on CD and vinyl. The vinyl version had a slightly different track order, due to the side length constraints of the format. The first disc of the CD edition contained a QuickTime video of a performance of "Piano Piece No. 13 (Carpenter's Piece)", which showed Sonic Youth nailing piano keys down one by one.

Critical reception 

SYR: Goodbye 20th Century received mixed reviews from critics, but most praised the group's efforts at popularizing and reinterpreting the composers' works. The album placed second in The Wires annual critics' poll for record of the year.

Personnel 

 Sonic Youth

 Thurston Moore – vocals, guitar, production
 Kim Gordon – vocals, guitar, bass, production
 Lee Ranaldo – vocals, guitar, production
 Jim O'Rourke – bass, production
 Steve Shelley – drums, percussion, production

 Additional personnel

 William Winant – percussion, production
 Takehisa Kosugi – violin
 Christian Wolff – keyboards
 Christian Marclay – turntables
 Coco Hayley Moore – vocals

 Technical

 Wharton Tiers – recording
 Luc Suer – recording
 Steve Fallone – mastering
 Chris Habib – sleeve graphics

References

External links 
 
 

Sonic Youth albums
1999 albums
Sonic Youth Recordings albums